Essex—Kent was a federal electoral district in Ontario that was represented in the House of Commons of Canada from 1979 to 1997.

It was created in 1976 from parts of Essex—Windsor, Kent—Essex and Lambton—Kent ridings, and initially consisted of the Townships of Colchester South, Gosfield North, Gosfield South, Mersea and Pelee, in the County of Essex, but excluding the Town of Essex, and Townships of Harwich, Raleigh, Romney and Tilbury East, including the Town of Tilbury, in the County of Kent.

In 1987, Essex—Kent was re-defined to consist of the towns of Harrow, Kingsville and Leamington and the townships of Colchester North, Colchester South, Gosfield North, Gosfield South, Mersea and Pelee in the County of Essex, and the towns of Blenheim and Tilbury and the villages of Erieau, Erie Beach and Wheatley in the County of Kent.

The electoral district was redistributed in 1996 in to Essex and Kent—Essex ridings.

Members of Parliament

This riding has elected the following Members of Parliament:

Electoral history

|-
  
|Liberal
|Robert Daudlin 
|align="right"|14,457
  
|Progressive Conservative
|David Conklin 
|align="right"| 13,181
 
|New Democratic
| Ralph Wensley 
|align="right"|4,759  

|-
  
|Liberal
|Robert Daudlin 
|align="right"|16,898
  
|Progressive Conservative
| Hank Vanderpol
|align="right"| 9,930 
 
|New Democratic
|David Wurfel 
|align="right"| 5,083  

|-
  
|Progressive Conservative
|James Eber Caldwell 
|align="right"| 18,661    
  
|Liberal
|Hugo Tiessen 
|align="right"| 9,268 
 
|New Democratic
|Peter Toye 
|align="right"|4,234   

|-
  
|Liberal
|Jerry Pickard 
|align="right"|18,634 
  
|Progressive Conservative
|James Eber Caldwell
|align="right"|12,181 
 
|New Democratic
|John Coggans
|align="right"|6,935

|-
  
|Liberal
|Jerry Pickard  
|align="right"|21,865  

  
|Progressive Conservative
|Kevin Charles Flood
|align="right"|4,742 
 
|New Democratic
|Mike Darnell
|align="right"|2,005 
  
|Natural Law
|Lester Newby
|align="right"|226

See also 

 List of Canadian federal electoral districts
 Past Canadian electoral districts

External links 

 Website of the Parliament of Canada

Former federal electoral districts of Ontario